1 Buck is a 2017 American thriller film directed by Fabien Dufils, starring John Freeman, Cassi Colvin, Katie Lynne Ryan, Darren Kendrick and Will Green.

Cast
 John Freeman as Harry Maggio
 Cassi Colvin as Sonia
 Katie Lynne Ryan as Amara
 Darren Kendrick as Jay
 Will Green as Jordan
 Peter Tahoe as Rex
 Charlotte Bjornbak as Maria
 Melissa Schumacher as Samantha
 Tony Sallemi as Christian
 Kassandra Mahea as Cassie
 Raylee Magill as Janet
 Peggy Fields Richardson as Kate Pinkle
 Robin Zamora as Thomas

Release
The film was released to Video on Demand on 21 September 2017.

Reception
Elizabeth Kerr of The Hollywood Reporter wrote, "It’s not quite as clever as it thinks it is, or as original, but it does manage a strong sense of morbid curiosity as to how events will shake out."

Gary Goldstein of the Los Angeles Times wrote that "Dufils vividly captures the locale’s seedy, swampy vibe, with its dive bars, shabby homes, ubiquitous convenience stores and underground fight spots. If only there were a more compelling, engaging narrative to match."

References

External links
 
 

American thriller films
2017 thriller films